Merriweather Park at Symphony Woods is a large central park in downtown Columbia, Maryland.  The park includes the Chrysalis, a 2016 amphitheater with lawn seating. The Chrysalis has hosted musical performances, ballet, plays, Maker Faire, and numerous community events.

History  

In 2013, former Rouse Company employee Michael McCall proposed county executive-backed plans to convert the wooded land into a destination park. McCall's company, Strategic Leisure, first proposed a $50 million publicly funded six-story parking garage at the Toby's Dinner Theatre location; later proposals included a 39-acre arts park with features such as an outdoor amphitheater called the Chrysalis, a 300-foot-long floating picnic table, and an 800-foot-long tube called the Caterpillar. The new project was named the "Inner Arbor", a spin on another Rouse development, Baltimore's "Inner Harbor". Artist William Cochran, Howard County native, was commissioned for artwork that includes horns up to 28 feet tall.

The Chrysalis opened for its inaugural season in 2017.

See also 
 Merriweather Post Pavilion

References

External links 

 

Columbia, Maryland
Howard County, Maryland
Amphitheaters in the United States
Music venues in Maryland
Tourist attractions in Howard County, Maryland